David “Dave” Kincaid (born March 21, 1957) is an American musician who co-founded the Seattle band The Allies, and the New York band The Brandos with Ernie Mendillo in 1985. Besides playing with The Brandos, Kincaid has also released two albums of Irish music under the name David Kincaid.

As a musician he has worked with Scott Kempner, Dennis Diken, Simon Kirke, John Whelan, Jerry O'Sullivan and Liz Knowles.

Discography

 The Irish Volunteer - 1998
 The Irish-American's Song - 2001

External links
[  The Brandos at Allmusic]
The Brandos

Living people
1956 births
American rock singers
American rock guitarists
Musicians from Seattle
The Brandos members